Apatema acutivalva is a moth of the family Autostichidae. It is found on Cyprus.

References

Moths described in 2000
Apatema
Moths of Europe